John William Bach (July 10, 1924 – January 18, 2016) was an American professional basketball player and coach.  A forward/guard, Bach played college basketball at Fordham University and Brown University.  He was selected by the Boston Celtics in the 1948 Basketball Association of America (BAA) Draft, and played 34 games for the Celtics.

Career
In 1950, at age 26, Bach became one of the nation's youngest head coaches at a major college when he took over the coaching job at Fordham. He spent 18 years there, taking seven Ram teams to post-season tourneys. From 1968 to 1978, he coached at Penn State, where he joined three old friends from Brown–Rip Engle, Joe Paterno and Joe McMullen. Although he led the Nittany Lions to five winning seasons, he would never reach the postseason.

Bach would later coach the Golden State Warriors for three years.  He served as an interim coach in 1980, and then as the full-time coach from 1983 to 1986. In 1986, Bach joined the Chicago Bulls as an assistant and became the architect of the "Doberman defense", the aggressive defensive effort led by Michael Jordan, Scottie Pippen, and Horace Grant. After the team won three championships from 1991 to 1993, Bach moved on to coaching jobs with the Charlotte Hornets, Detroit Pistons and Washington Wizards. He returned to the Bulls in 2003, and retired in 2006.

Later life
After retiring from basketball, Bach turned to painting. In 2007, thirty-two of his watercolors were put on display at the Sevan Gallery in Skokie, Illinois.

Death
Bach died on January 18, 2016, in Chicago at the age of 91. Bach's funeral was held two days later on January 20, 2016, at the Old St. Patrick's Church in Chicago. As a World War II US Navy Ensign he was buried at Abraham Lincoln National Cemetery in Elwood, Illinois.

BAA career statistics

Regular season

Head coaching record

College basketball

Professional basketball

|-
| style="text-align:left;"|GSW
| style="text-align:left;"|
|21||6||15||.286|| style="text-align:center;"|6th in Pacific||-||-||-||-
| style="text-align:center;"|Missed Playoffs
|-
| style="text-align:left;"|GSW
| style="text-align:left;"|
|82||37||45||.451|| style="text-align:center;"|5th in Pacific||-||-||-||-
| style="text-align:center;"|Missed Playoffs
|-
| style="text-align:left;"|GSW
| style="text-align:left;"|
|82||22||60||.268|| style="text-align:center;"|6th in Pacific||-||-||-||-
| style="text-align:center;"|Missed Playoffs
|-
| style="text-align:left;"|GSW
| style="text-align:left;"|
|82||30||52||.366|| style="text-align:center;"|6th in Pacific||-||-||-||-
| style="text-align:center;"|Missed Playoffs
|- class="sortbottom"
| style="text-align:left;"|Career
| ||267||95||172||.356|| ||-||-||-||.-

References

External links

 BasketballReference.com: Johnny Bach (as coach)
 BasketballReference.com: Johnny Bach (as player)
 NBA.com Coach File: John Bach
 

1924 births
2016 deaths
American men's basketball coaches
American men's basketball players
Basketball players from New York City
Basketball coaches from New York (state)
Boston Celtics draft picks
Boston Celtics players
Charlotte Hornets assistant coaches
Chicago Bulls assistant coaches
Detroit Pistons assistant coaches
Fordham Rams athletic directors
Fordham Rams men's basketball coaches
Fordham Rams men's basketball players
Golden State Warriors head coaches
Penn State Nittany Lions basketball coaches
Shooting guards
Small forwards
Sportspeople from Brooklyn
Washington Wizards assistant coaches
 United States Navy officers
Burials at Abraham Lincoln National Cemetery